The Ancestral Home (Dom Ojczysty) was a political party in Poland, founded after the elections. After 1870, more than 3.5 million Polish people migrated to the United States leaving Poland. Mainly the impoverished peasants facing diminished prospects at home started looking across the ocean for greater opportunities, particularly in the rapidly industrializing cities of the northern United States. There was a political dimension to their movement as well. Once a major power in central Europe, the Polish state had ceased to exist in 1795, when Russia, Prussia, and Austria carved it into three dependent territories. Conditions in western, or German, Poland—the ancestral home of more than 80 percent of Milwaukee's Poles—were especially harsh. Military conscription and cultural repression made emigration an obvious choice. These historical events could have been the idea behind the formation of the party.

References

Conservative parties in Poland
Catholic political parties
Defunct political parties in Poland
Political parties with year of establishment missing
National Democracy